Not Wanted on Voyage is a 1957 British comedy film directed by Maclean Rogers and starring Ronald Shiner, Brian Rix and Catherine Boyle. The film was made at British National Studios. It is based on a play by Ken Attiwill and his wife Evadne Price.

Plot
Two cabin stewards working on a luxury vessel on a Mediterranean cruise to Tangier attempt to earn extra money from the passengers using every possible means. However, when one of the wealthy dowagers has her valuable diamond necklace stolen, they do everything they can to ensure it is restored to her.

Cast
 Ronald Shiner as Steward Albert Higgins  
 Brian Rix as Steward Cecil Hollebone
 Griffith Jones as Guy Harding   
 Catherine Boyle (Katie Boyle) as Julie Hains    
 Fabia Drake as Mrs. Brough  
 Michael Brennan as Chief Steward  
 Michael Shepley as Col. Blewton-Fawcett  
 Dorinda Stevens as Pat 
 Martin Boddey as Captain  
 Janet Barrow as Lady Maud Catesby  
 Therese Burton as Mrs. Rose  
 John Chapman as Mr. Rose  
 Peter Prowse as Strang 
 Eric Pohlmann as Pedro  
 Larry Noble as Steward Bleeding  
 Michael Ripper as Steward Macy  
 Hugh Moxey as 1st Officer

Critical reception
TV Guide wrote, "Too much corn stops this comedy from popping"; while Allmovie wrote, "Even those filmgoers who'd seen and heard the wheezy gags in Not Wanted on Voyage in earlier films were amused by the breezy ridiculousness of the project."

References

External links
 

1957 films
1957 comedy films
British comedy films
British films based on plays
Films shot at British National Studios
Seafaring films
Films set in the Mediterranean Sea
Films set in Gibraltar
Films set in Tangier
Films directed by Maclean Rogers
1950s English-language films
1950s British films